Jim Sarbh (born 27 August 1987) is an Indian film and stage actor. Best known for his supporting work in the Hindi films, he is the recipient of a Screen Award, an International Indian Film Academy Award and two Filmfare Award nominations. Additionally, Sarbh has directed and acted in numerous theatre productions in India.

Sarbh made his feature film debut in 2016, playing the antagonist in Ram Madhvani's critically and commercially successful biographical drama Neerja; the role garnered him positive reviews from critics and such accolades as a Filmfare Award for Best Supporting Actor nomination and a Screen Award. Following his role in the thriller A Death in the Gunj (2016), he rose to prominence for playing antagonist in the period drama Padmaavat (2018) and the biopic Sanju (2018), both of which rank among the highest-grossing Indian films of all time. In 2022, he is playing Dr. Homi Bhabha in the series Rocket Boys.

In addition to his film career, Sarbh has regularly appeared in theatre productions, particularly those based in Mumbai. He has attracted attention for his performances in the 2013 revival of Death of a Salesman, Rajat Kapoor's What's Done is Done, and Kalki Koechlin's Living Room. He made his directorial debut in 2014 with Bull. For his extensive work in theatre, Sarbh was listed in Forbes Indias 30 under 30 list in 2015.

Personal life 
Jim Sarbh was born on 27 August 1987 in Bombay, Maharashtra, India into a Parsi Zoroastrian family. His mother is a retired physiotherapist, and his father is a former master mariner, and the Regional Director of P&O Ports South and Middle East Asia. The family moved to Australia from India when Sarbh was three years old and came back to Bombay when he was eight, where he first attended Bombay International School in South Mumbai and then the American School of Bombay in Bandra, West Mumbai. He completed his undergraduate degree in Psychology from the Emory University in Atlanta, Georgia, United States. He currently lives in Versova, Mumbai.

Career

Theatre roles and Bollywood debut (2009–2016)
After graduating from the Emory University, Sarbh worked with the Alliance Theatre in Atlanta for a year as a literary intern. He performed around Atlanta in the 2009 productions of such plays as The Show!, The Breakup, Tennis in Nablus, and Ice Glen; the last of the roles won him a Major Supporting Role Metropolitan Atlanta Theatre Award. Sarbh moved back to Mumbai in 2012 and began acting in local theatre productions. His performance as Happy Loman in Alyque Padamsee's 2013 revival of Death of a Salesman drew the attention of several commentators. Sarbh continued to act in Mumbai-based plays including Rajat Kapoor's What's Done is Done, Rage Productions's The Glass Menagerie, Vickram Kapadia's The Merchant of Venice, Kalki Koechlin's Living Room, and later made his directorial and writing debut with the 2014 production Bull and Eat respectively. He was listed in Forbes Indias 30 under 30 list in 2015 for his contributions to the Mumbai theatre industry.

Sarbh made his feature film debut with Ram Madhvani's 2016 biographical drama film Neerja. He had two other releases in 2016Jyoti Patil's Yashodhara and Daria Gai's 3 ½ Takes. He also worked on the short films Mama’s Boys by Akshat Verma, and Like Summer Like Rain by Gouri Dutt.

Continued film career (2017–present)
Sarbh had two Bollywood releases in 2017the thriller A Death in the Gunj and the romance film Raabta. He also starred in Natasha Mendonca's directorial debut Ajeeb Ashiq, an independent film that focuses on the gender identity and human sexuality. The production was screened at various film festivals across Europe. He played the role of Malik Kafur in Sanjay Leela Bhansali's 2018 epic romance Padmaavat, featuring alongside Shahid Kapoor, Deepika Padukone and Ranveer Singh. In 2019, he had a role in the Netflix film House Arrest, and the following year featured in Yeh Ballet, another Netflix film.

In 2020, he appeared in Bejoy Nambiar's Taish releasing on ZEE5 in October.

In 2022, he appeared in the film Gangubai Kathiawadi as Amin Faizi, webseries Rocket Boys as Homi J. Bhabha and Eternally Confused and Eager for Love as a Wiz, a voiceover.

Filmography

Films

Web series

Music videos

Short films

Awards and nominations

References

External links 

 
 

Living people
Indian male film actors
Male actors from Mumbai
1987 births
Parsi people from Mumbai
Emory University alumni
Screen Awards winners
Zee Cine Awards winners
International Indian Film Academy Awards winners